The Seymour Line is a regional passenger rail service operated by V/Line in Victoria, Australia. It serves passengers between the state capital of Melbourne and the regional city of Seymour, along with a number of smaller communities in between.

Services
V/Line operates hourly passenger services to Melbourne, with Sprinter and VLocity railcars used on quieter services, as well as locomotive hauled H type carriages during peak times. Beyond Seymour, three daily passenger trains run as the Albury Line and five daily services run as the Shepparton Line.

Line Guide

References

External links 

V/Line website

V/Line rail services
Transport in the City of Hume
Public transport routes in the City of Melbourne (LGA)
Transport in the City of Whittlesea